Thala is a town and commune in Tunisia. It is located in the Kasserine Governorate since 1956.
As of the 2004 census it had  inhabitants.

History 
During the Roman Empire Thala was the site of a Roman settlement and was the seat of an ancient bishopric. It still has a titular absentee bishop  (currently the auxiliary Bishop of Sydney, Richard Umbers), who is appointed by the Pope.

In 1906, an attack by local bedouin on the French civil administration offices during the Thala-Kasserine Disturbances was the first violent resistance to French authority under the protectorate.

Thala was the scene of fierce fighting during World War II, in the late stages of the Battle of the Kasserine Pass. The 10th Panzer Division sought to exploit its early success against US forces. In a series of defensive actions on 21 February 1943, the British 26th Armoured Brigade, part of Nickforce, and the divisional artillery of the U.S. 9th infantry Division, arriving after an 800-mile forced march, blocked an advance by the German division's Kampfgruppe which, despite coming under the personal command of Erwin Rommel, were finally unable to make headway through fire from British tanks and artillery.

Geography

Climate

The climate in Thala is cold semi-arid (BSk, according to the Köppen climate classification), with Mediterranean influences. Summers are moderately hot (by Saharan standards) and dry, and winters are chilly and wetter. Snowfalls can occur sometimes.

Notes

References 

Populated places in Kasserine Governorate
Communes of Tunisia
Roman towns and cities in Tunisia
Ancient Berber cities